Jacopo Fanucchi (born September 18, 1981) is an Italian football forward who currently plays for Lucchese.

External links 

Living people
Serie B players
Association football forwards
1981 births
Italian footballers
Sportspeople from Lucca
A.C. Prato players
Empoli F.C. players
Pisa S.C. players
U.S. Alessandria Calcio 1912 players
U.S. Città di Pontedera players
Footballers from Tuscany